Elections to Rochford Council were held on 4 May 2000.  One third of the council was up for election and the council stayed under no overall control.

After the election, the composition of the council was
Conservative 19
Liberal Democrat 9
Labour 9
Residents 2
Independent 1

Election result

References
2000 Rochford election result
Election round-up: Tory triumph in Rochford but council still hung

2000
2000 English local elections
2000s in Essex